Hans von Rüte (died 23 March 1558) was a Bernese dramatist and chronicler of the Swiss Reformation.
His plays for the Bernese Fasnacht is an important contemporary sources for Swiss historiography of the mid-16th century.

Biography
Von Rüte is recorded as acquiring Bernese citizenship in 1528. In the same year he married the former nun Cathrin Hetzel von Lindnach. His origin and earlier biography is unknown. He has variously been identified as a native of Emmental, Solothurn, Aarau or Berne itself.
In 1531 he was elected into the city council. In 1545 he was found guilty of adultery and lost his office as scrivener, which he was granted again, however, in 1546. In 1555 he was made bailiff at Zofingen, where he died in 1558.

Works
Von Rüte's plays are based on biblical narratives. He mocks the Catholic veneration of saints as idolatry, likening the Protestant Reformation to the fight against Canaanite idolatry in the Hebrew Bible. Six plays were printed. A modern edition in three volumes was prepared in 2000.

Fasznachtspiel (Abgötterei, performed 1531, printed 1532)
Joseph (1538)
Gedeon [Gideon] (1540)
Noe [Noah] (1545)
Goliath (1555)
Osterspiel (1552)

See also
Carnival in Bern

References

Jakob Baechtold: 'Rüte, Hans von'. In: Allgemeine Deutsche Biographie (ADB). vol. 30, Duncker & Humblot, Leipzig 1890, p. 39.
Friedericke Christ-Kutter: 'Hans von Rüte. Ein immer noch unbekannter Berner Dichter aus der Reformationszeit'. In: Der Mohr. vol. 25, Bern 1998, 11–25.
Glenn Ehrstine: Theater, Culture, and Community in Reformation Bern, 1523-1555. Leiden 2002.
Kenneth Alan Fisher: Hans von Rüte. A dramatist of the Swiss Reformation, Austin (Texas) 1975.

People from Bern
Swiss dramatists and playwrights
Swiss writers in German
16th-century Swiss writers
1558 deaths
Reformation in Switzerland